= Rape during the Gulf War =

Wartime rape during Gulf War

During the Gulf War and Iraqi occupation of Kuwait, Iraqi military personnel engaged in systematic rape in Kuwait. Iraqi troops raped at least an estimated 5,000 Kuwaiti women. These rapes were perpetrated in front of victims' families or in Iraqi camps. Eyewitness testimonies confirmed the rapes perpetrated by the Iraqi regime. Although rape victims and their families were reluctant to discuss the rapes, several Kuwaiti prisoners reported witnessing Iraqi troops raping women.

== Rapes ==
Since early September 1990 Amnesty International received reports that Iraqi military personnel were raping Kuwaiti and other Arab women. Egyptian diplomatic sources claimed that in one instance three Egyptian air hostesses were raped on 3 August 1990 at the Meridient Hitel. Amnesty International was informed by an Egyptian nurse from Mubarak Hospital of the admission of a number of Arab female rape victims. The nurse personally performed gynaecological tests of one of the victims, who was a young Palestinian girl. The girl had been gang-raped by five Iraqi troops in the district of Hawalli where she had been taken to. The Egyptian nurse also reported the admission of a female Kuwaiti rape victim in Mubarak Hospital who was raped by Iraqi military personnel in her residence in al-Salmiyya. Amnesty International was informed by a Kuwaiti doctor about fifteen occurrences of rape in al-Jahra, another fifteen in al-Rigga and three rape incidents at the Maternity Hospital. The victims included Arab girls.

An Egyptian medical professional employed at al-Sabah Hospital reported to Amnesty International of an incident where three Iraqi soldiers gang-raped a mother after she pleaded with the soldiers to rape her instead of her virgin daughter. Amnesty International was also informed of the rape of four Kuwaiti girls perpetrated in al-Rumaithiyya. A Kuwaiti medical professional who was employed at the Maternity Hospital reported the rape of two girls who he personally examined, including a 20 year old Jordanian girl who was gang-raped by five Iraqi soldiers.

It was stated in a declassified report that Iraqis disrespected the religious traditions of fellow Muslims as they raped Kuwaiti girls including virgins knowing this would effect their marriage prospects and that abortion is prohibited under Islamic law.

== Aftermath ==
The Grand Mufti of Al-Azhar pronounced a fatwa permitting victims to abort their pregnancies caused by Iraqi troops. Kuwaiti Muftis did not permit abortions of the pregnancies arising from the rapes of Kuwaiti girls by Iraqi troops. Islamic legal jurists commented on the rapes by stating that the children born from these rapes were innocent Kuwaiti Muslims.
